Il re Teodoro in Venezia is a 1784 comic opera by Giovanni Paisiello to a libretto Giovanni Battista Casti. Premiered at the Burgtheater Vienna, it was revived for Carnival in Parma in 1788.

Recordings
Il re Teodoro in Venezia : Cecilia Fusco, Rukmini Sukmawati, Nicola Monti, Sesto Bruscantini, Angelo Nosotti, I Virtuosi di Roma, cond. Renato Fasano 1962
Il re Teodoro in Venezia : Teodoro – André Cognet, Gafforio –Stuart Kale, Belisa Emanuela Barazia, Taddeo Fabio Previati. La Fenice, cond. Isaac Karabtchevsky 1998

References

Operas
1784 operas
operas by Giovanni Paisiello